The Prairie Grove Cemetery is a historic cemetery on West Buchanan and Kate Smith Streets in Prairie Grove, Washington County, Arkansas.  Located just west of downtown Prairie Grove, the cemetery is the burial ground for many of the area's early settlers, with the oldest known burial occurring in 1818.  It has more than 3,000 interments, and continues in active use.  It is owned and maintained by a private not-for-profit cemetery association.

Gallery

See also
 National Register of Historic Places listings in Washington County, Arkansas

References

External links

 

Cemeteries on the National Register of Historic Places in Arkansas
Buildings and structures completed in 1818
Protected areas of Washington County, Arkansas
Buildings and structures in Washington County, Arkansas
National Register of Historic Places in Washington County, Arkansas
Cemeteries established in the 1810s